Phialia may refer to:
Phigalia, a city of ancient Arcadia, Greece
 Stericta, a genus of moths